2015 Armenian protests may refer to:
 Protests against the government and new constitution
 Protests against a hike in electricity rates